Dean Bergeron (born February 12, 1969 in La Baie, Quebec (now Saguenay, Quebec)) is a Paralympic athlete from Canada who competed mainly in category T52 sprint events in four Paralympic Games and is pursuing a career as an actuary.

Biography 
Bergeron was born in La Baie, Quebec (now Saguenay) on February 12, 1969. In 1986 at the age of 17, he joined the Shawinigan Cataractes of the Quebec Major Junior Hockey League to pursue professional ice hockey. He is then 17 years old, and promised a bright future. In an accident during a training session match in 1987, he sustained a spinal cord injury and became paraplegic. He returned to physical activity during his studies in actuarial science at Laval University.

Paralympian career 

Dean Bergeron continued in the field of athletics with wheelchair racing, also known as track and field athletics. He has participated in several world championships and other international competitions presenting this event. He competed at the Atlanta 1996, Sydney 2000, Athens 2004 and Beijing 2008 Games, and recorded a total of 11 Paralympic medals.

Bergeron holds the world record in the 200m distance. He was the first athlete in his discipline to break the 400-meter distance in less than a minute (58s 54). He also holds the Canadian records for 200m, 400m, 800m and 1500m of this discipline. He was a triple medalist at the 2008 Paralympic Games (two gold and one bronze).

He has also participated in the Boston Marathons in 1999 and 2004 and the Ottawa Marathons in 2006 and 2007 in the wheelchair racing category. He won the marathon at his first participation in 1999. For the years 2004, 2006 and 2007, he finished 2nd, 7th and 2nd respectively.

Paralympic Games Results 

At the 1996 Summer Paralympics in Atlanta, United States, he won a gold medal in the men's 200 metres - T51 event, a silver medal in the men's 400 metres - T51 event, a silver medal in the men's 1500 metres - T51 event and a bronze medal in the men's 100 metres - T51 event.

At the 2000 Summer Paralympics in Sydney, Australia, he won a bronze medal in the men's 200 metres - T51 event, a bronze medal in the men's 400 metres - T51 event, finished fifth in the men's 100 metres - T51 event and finished sixth in the men's 800 metres - T51 event.

At the 2004 Summer Paralympics in Athens, Greece, he won  a bronze medal in the men's 800 metres - T52 event, finished fourth in the men's 200 metres - T52 event, finished fifth in the men's 400 metres - T52 event and did not finish in  the men's 1500 metres - T52 event.

At the 2008 Summer Paralympics in Beijing, China, he won a gold medal in the men's 100 metres - T52 event, a gold medal in the men's 200 metres - T52 event, a bronze medal in the men's 400 metres - T52 event and finished sixth in the men's 800 metres - T52 event

World Championships results 

 2002-07: CIP World Championships (Lille/Villeneuve-d'Ascq, France)
Event: 100m Position: 2nd position Result: 18.64

 2002-07: CIP World Championships (Lille/Villeneuve-d'Ascq, France)
Event: 400m Position: 2nd position Result:

 2002-07: CIP World Championships (Lille/Villeneuve-d'Ascq, France)
Event: 200m Position: 3rd position Result: 35.02

 1998-08-13: World Championships (Birmingham, United Kingdom)
Event: 200m, 800m Position: 2nd position Result:

 1995: World Championships (Stoke Mandeville, United Kingdom)
Event: 100m Position: 1st position Result:

 1995: World Championships (Stoke Mandeville, United Kingdom)
Event: 200m, 400m, 1500m Position: 1st position Result:

 1994-07-30: World Championships (Berlin, Germany)
Event: 800 m Position: 1st position Result: 32.07

Career in insurance 

In addition to athletics, Dean Bergeron also pursued a career in the insurance field. Since 1993, he has been working in the field of life insurance. He has held positions as an insurance products advisor, including at Desjardins Financial Security. In June 2009, Dean Bergeron joined La Capitale Financial Group. After holding various executive positions including Director of Marketing and Health Promotion, and Senior Director of Operations. He holds the position of Vice President of Administration and Client Relations in the group insurance sector of this company.

From 2014-2020, Bergeron served on the Board of Directors at Praxis Spinal Cord Institute, a Canadian not-for-profit organization for spinal cord injury research and care.

Honors 

Dean Bergeron was named "Male Athlete of the Year" at the Sport-Québec Gala in 2009, a title recognizing the best athlete across all sports in Quebec (Chantal Petitclerc having earned the same honor on the female side the same year). He chosen as one of sixteen athletes to carry the Paralympic Flame at the 2010 Paralympic Winter Games of Vancouver and had the honor of lighting the olympic bowl in Quebec when the flame stopped there on December 2, 2009. Bergeron was admitted to the Parasports Quebec Hall of Fame in 2017. That same year, he was inducted into the Quebec Sports Hall of Fame. In April 2018, it was announced that the second ice rink of the Center Jean-Claude-Tremblay of The Bay would bear his name. The ice rink was one designed for the paralympic sport sledge hockey.  In June of the same year, he received the Gloire de l'Escolle medal, also named Grand Graduate Award, which is the highest distinction awarded by the Foundation of Laval University.

On December 12, 2018, Dean Bergeron's name was given to the second ice rink of the arena of the La Baie borough of the city of Saguenay in recognition of his perseverance and athletic accomplishments.

References

External links
 
 Profile on Défi sportif

1969 births
Paralympic track and field athletes of Canada
Athletes (track and field) at the 1996 Summer Paralympics
Athletes (track and field) at the 2000 Summer Paralympics
Athletes (track and field) at the 2004 Summer Paralympics
Athletes (track and field) at the 2008 Summer Paralympics
Paralympic gold medalists for Canada
Paralympic silver medalists for Canada
Paralympic bronze medalists for Canada
Sportspeople from Saguenay, Quebec
Living people
Medalists at the 1996 Summer Paralympics
Medalists at the 2000 Summer Paralympics
Medalists at the 2004 Summer Paralympics
Medalists at the 2008 Summer Paralympics
Laval Rouge et Or athletes
Paralympic medalists in athletics (track and field)
Canadian male wheelchair racers